Chandragiri may refer to places in:

India
 Chandragiri, a suburb and neighborhood of Tirupati in Tirupati district, Andhra Pradesh
 Chandragiri mandal, a mandal (or tehsil) in Tirupati district, Andhra Pradesh
 Chandragiri Hill, a hill in Shravanabelagola, Karnataka
 Chandragiri, Odisha, a Gram Panchayat in Gajapati district, Odisha
 Chandragiri Fort, Andhra Pradesh, a fort in Tirupati, Andhra Pradesh 
 Chandragiri Fort, Kerala, a 17th-century fort in Kasargod district, Kerala

Nepal
 Chandragiri Hill, Nepal, a hill in Kathmandu district
 Chandragiri Municipality, a municipality in Kathmandu district

See also
 Chandragiri Fort (disambiguation)
 Chandragiri Vatika, Jain monument in Rajasthan, India
 Chandradrona hills or Baba Budangiri, hill in Karnataka, India